Coimbatore Marine College is a college for maritime education and training in Coimbatore, Tamil Nadu, India, founded in 2001. The college offers education and training in pre-sea and post-sea training for candidates from cadets through masters of ships. The institute is recognised by the Directorate General of Shipping (DGS), Government of India, and is affiliated to Indian Maritime University.

Departments 
The major departments are:

 Nautical science
 Marine engineering
 Pre Sea Training courses
 ETO Training Courses
 Graduate Marine Engineering
 Orientation course for catering personnel
 Marine engineering (Lateral entry)
 BBA Logistics and shipping
 MBA Logistics and shipping
 B.Com logistics and shipping
 B.Com corporate secretaryship with C.A

Accreditation
CMC and its courses are approved by the DGS, which is responsible for maritime administration and for overseeing maritime education and training in India.

Admissions 
Admissions for CMC B.Tech Courses are based on All India level online exams conducted by Indian Maritime University. The preliminary round of entrance examinations are done online. Admissions for other courses are done after interview at the college campus.

Campus 
The campus is a  area, with outdoor and indoor sports facilities like cricket,  basketball, badminton, volleyball, table tennis, and carom, with a swimming pool and a gym.

The college has a model ship on campus for training marine engineers called TS Clarissa.

The college has a residential arrangement with both a boys' and girls' hostel facility on the campus.

References

External links 
 

Maritime colleges in India
Universities and colleges in Coimbatore
Educational institutions established in 2001
2001 establishments in Tamil Nadu